Bowie is a town in Montague County, Texas, United States. The population was 5,218 at the 2010 census.

History
On July 22, 1881, Bowie was incorporated as a town in Montague County, Texas, United States. (A separate Bowie County includes Texarkana in northeastern Texas.) The town began to expand with the arrival of the Fort Worth and Denver Railway in 1882.  In 1884, four men robbed the First National Bank of Bowie and allegedly left with over $10,000 in gold coins. Townspeople gave chase and eventually captured the robbers, who were hanged for their crimes. By 1913, the town had a population of more than 5000, and included the Bowie Commercial College.

U.S. President Franklin D. Roosevelt visited the town on his train on July 11, 1938.  He ceremonially purchased biscuits from businessman Amon G. Carter of Fort Worth, who had grown up in Bowie.  On August 19, 1941, Rex Beard, Jr., robbed the First National Bank of Bowie and was captured in December of that same year.
An EF1 tornado hit the town of Bowie on May 22, 2020. On March 21, 2022, two EF1 tornadoes hit the town.

Geography

Roads 
 U.S. Route 81
 U.S. Route 287
 Texas State Highway 59

Demographics

2020 census

As of the 2020 United States census,  5,448 people, 1,911 households, and 1,333 families resided in the city.

2010 census
As of the 2010 United States Census, 5,218 people and 2,090 households, with 2,489 housing units, were in the town. The population density was 945.6 people per square mile. The average household size was 2.32 persons and the average family size was 2.99. The racial makeup of the town was 91.9% White, 0.2% African American, 1.0% Native American, 0.7% Asian, and 2.0% from two or more races. Hispanics or Latinos of any race were 11.6% of the population.  The median income for a household in the town was $33,846.  The per capita income for the town was $19,063.

Education
The town is served by the Bowie Independent School District and a branch campus of North Central Texas College.

Notable people
Woodrow Chambliss, actor

Gallery

Climate
The climate in this area is characterized by hot, humid summers and generally mild to cool winters.  According to the Köppen climate classification, Bowie has a humid subtropical climate, Cfa on climate maps.

References

Further reading

External links

 The town of Bowie, Texas Chamber of Commerce
 Bowie Independent School District Website

Cities in Texas
Cities in Montague County, Texas